Colt(s) or COLT may refer to:

Colt (horse), an intact (uncastrated) male horse under four years of age

People
Colt (given name)
Colt (surname)

Places
Colt, Arkansas, United States
Colt, Louisiana, an unincorporated community, United States
Camp Colt, Pennsylvania, a World War I military installation for United States tank training
Colt Island, County Dublin, Ireland
Colt Stadium, Houston, Texas, United States

Acronyms
Bergen Corpus of London Teenage Language, a spoken language corpus of English
Cell On Light Truck: similar to Cell on wheels, but built on to a small truck, instead of a trailer
Combat Observation Laser Teams, an artillery observer responsible for directing laser-guided munitions
Computational learning theory, the mathematical field of machine learning algorithms
 County of Lackawanna Transit System, Pennsylvania, United States

Arts, entertainment, and media

 Colts Drum and Bugle Corps, a drum and bugle corps from Dubuque, Iowa

The Colt (film), a 2005 television movie
The Colt (Supernatural), a fictional firearm depicted in the U.S. television series Supernatural
Colt, a character from the Supercell game Brawl Stars

Brands and enterprises
Colt Group, a smoke control, solar shading and climate control company
COLT Studio Group, producers of gay pornography
Colt Technology Services, a European telecommunications company
Colt's Manufacturing Company, an American firearms company
Colt (cigarette), a cigarette brand

Computing and technology
Colt (libraries), Open Source Libraries for High Performance Scientific and Technical Computing in Java
 COLT (software), a livecoding tool for ActionScript and JavaScript languages

Sport

Mascots
Sanford H. Calhoun High School
Covina High School
Parkway Central High School
West Jessamine High School

Teams
Augusta Colts, a former indoor football team based in Augusta, Georgia
Baltimore Colts (1947–1950), an All-American Football Conference franchise from 1947 to 1949 that later spent the 1950 season in the NFL
Baltimore Colts, a National Football League franchise from 1953 to 1983, afterward relocating to Indianapolis - see History of the Baltimore Colts
Barrie Colts, an Ontario Hockey League franchise
Calgary Colts, a junior football team based in Calgary, Alberta, Canada
Chicago Cubs, a Major League Baseball franchise known as the Colts from 1890 through 1897
Cornwall Colts, a hockey team
Cranbrook Colts, a defunct Junior "A" and "B" hockey team in Cranbrook, British Columbia, Canada
Devonshire Colts, a football (soccer) club based in Devonshire, Bermuda
Houston Colt .45s, former Major League Baseball club, later renamed as the Houston Astros
Indianapolis Colts, a National Football League franchise
Mountainview Colts a Junior "B" ice hockey team based in Didsbury, Alberta, Canada
Portland Colts, a former minor league baseball team in Portland, Oregon
Richmond Colts, a minor league baseball team based in Richmond, Virginia, on-and-off from 1894 to 1953
San Angelo Colts, a professional baseball team based in San Angelo, Texas
San Angelo Colts (1948–57 baseball team), a minor league baseball team in San Angelo, Texas

Transportation
Antonov An-2, Russian Army biplane's NATO reporting name
Colt, a share taxi used in Indonesia
Colt Car Company, the British importer of Mitsubishi Motors, whose products were sold with Colt badges in numerous markets
Colt International, a provider of contract aviation fuel and flight planning services
Dodge Colt, a captive import version of the Mitsubishi Mirage made from 1970 to 1994
Mitsubishi Colt, a supermini built by Mitsubishi Motors
Colt Runabout, an early American automobile
Piper PA-22-108 Colt, an aircraft used for training pilots
Texas Aircraft Colt, a Brazilian design light sport aircraft built in Texas
 County of Lackawanna Transit System, Pennsylvania, United States

Other uses
Colt baronets, a title in the Baronetage of England
Ragen's Colts, a chiefly Irish Chicago street gang during the early twentieth century

See also
Colt 45 (disambiguation)
Kolt (disambiguation)